Chehel Morghian (also Romanized as Chehel Morghīān; also known as Chehel Morghān and Mowghīān) is a village in Eshqabad Rural District, Miyan Jolgeh District, Nishapur County, Razavi Khorasan Province, Iran. At the 2006 census, its population was 47, in 11 families.

References 

Populated places in Nishapur County